The thick-billed spiderhunter (Arachnothera crassirostris) is a species of bird in the family Nectariniidae.
It is found in Brunei, Indonesia, Malaysia, Singapore, and Thailand.
Its natural habitats are subtropical or tropical moist lowland forests and subtropical or tropical moist montane forests.

References

thick-billed spiderhunter
Birds of Malesia
thick-billed spiderhunter
Taxonomy articles created by Polbot
Taxa named by Ludwig Reichenbach